The Philippines participated at the 2018 Summer Youth Olympics, in Buenos Aires, Argentina from 6 October to 18 October 2018.

Kiteboarder Christian Tio won a silver medal men's kiteboarding IKA Twin Tip racing event; the first medal of any color credited to the National Olympic Committee (NOC) of the Philippines in the games' medal tally.

Previously, Archer Luis Gabriel Moreno along with a Chinese partner won a gold medal in the 2014 Summer Youth Olympics in the mixed international team event although the medal was neither credited to the NOC of the Philippines or China.

Background
The first Filipino athlete to qualify for the 2018 Summer Youth Olympics was Nicole Marie Tagle who secured qualification through the 2017 World Archery Youth Championships in October 2017.

The Philippines qualified its second athlete when Christian Tio of Boracay qualified for Summer Youth Olympics. He clinched the sole berth contested for the boy's twin tip racing event at the Asian qualifiers in Pranburi, Thailand on March 18, 2018.

The Philippines qualified its fifth athlete when fencer Lawrence Tan qualified for the Summer Youth Olympics. He secured his qualification for the individual boy's Foil (fencing) event at the 2018 Junior and Cadets World Fencing Championships held in Verona, Italy in April 2018.

Jonne Go of Canoe Kayak and Dragonboat served as the chief of mission of the Philippine delegation.

Medalists

Medal table

Medalists
The following Filipino competitors won medals at the Youth Olympics.

Archery

The Philippines qualified one archer based on its performance at the 2017 World Archery Youth Championships.

Individual

Team

Fencing

The Philippines qualified one fencer, Lawrence Tan, in the individual boy's foil event based on its performance at the 2018 Junior and Cadets World Fencing Championships held in Verona, Italy in April 2018.

Tan is the first Filipino fencer to qualify for the Youth Olympic Games.

Boys

Golf

Individual

Team

Sailing

The Philippines qualified one boat based on its performance at the Asian and Oceania IKA Twin Tip Racing Qualifiers.

Boys

Swimming

Girls

Table tennis

The Philippines qualified one athlete based on its performance at the "Road to Buenos Aires – Oceania" qualifier held in Rarotonga in the Cook Islands.

Singles

Team

References

Summer Youth Olympics
Nations at the 2018 Summer Youth Olympics
Summer Youth Olympics, 2018